Kisha e Shën Triadhës may refer to:

Kisha e Shën Triadhës (Berat)
Kisha e Shën Triadhës (Korçë)